TCG Osmangazi (NL-125) is an amphibious warfare ship of type landing craft tank  that was built for the Turkish Navy in the early 1990s. The ship remains in service.

History 
The landing ship was laid down at the Taşkızak Naval Shipyard in Istanbul, Turkey on 24 July 1990. After completion, she was  handed over to the Turkish Navy, and commissioned on 27 July 1994 . She was named Osmangazi after Osman I, the founder of the Ottoman Empire, and the full transliteration of Osman Gazi is Osman, the Veteran.

Characteristics 
The -long landing ship can carry up to 3,773 tons, which includes 900 armed troops as well as 15 ain battle tanks and also four LCVP's. It has a crew of 109, including nine officers. The ship is armed with 2x Bofors 40 mm/70 twin autocannon, 1x Oerlikon 35 mm/90 twin anti-aircraft gun and 2x Oerlikon 20 mm autocannon. This ship also has a large space for a 10-ton class helicopter to land. The vessel is capable of deploying naval mines.

Modernization 
The vessel underwent extensive modernization works at the Alaybey Naval Shipyard of the Turkish Navy in İzmir in 2011. Within this project, the two Bofors 40 mm/70 twin autocannons in the ship's bow, which can be handloaded only, were replaced by two Oerlikon 35 mm/90 twin anti-aircraft guns. The  Oerlikon 35 mm gun at the ship's stem was removed, and a Mk-15 Phalanx CIWS was integrated. A SLQ-32 electronic warfare suite was installed on  the shipboard of Osmangazi, as being the first Turkish landing vessel having an electronic warfare system.

Earthquake relief operation 
The vessel transported heavy construction equipment from Port of İzmir to be used in the disaster region of the 2023 earthquake in southern Turkey.

References

External links 
Unofficial homepage of the Turkish Navy

Amphibious warfare vessels of the Turkish Navy
Landing craft
1990s ships
Ships built in Istanbul